Florin Piersic (born 27 January 1936) is a well-known Romanian actor and TV personality. He is particularly famous for his leading roles in The White Moor and the Margelatu series films. He has a reputation, often parodied in popular culture, as a raconteur.

In 2006 and 2011 the actor was chosen by Disney Pixar to provide the Romanian voice of Mack in the animated movie Cars.

Biography
Piersic's parents were from Bucovina, his mother was born in Valea Seacă, and his father, Ștefan Piersic, a veterinary physician, was originally from Corlata. Piersic spent his childhood years in Corlata, Pojorâta and Cajvana, later, in Cernăuţi, and then his family moved to Cluj, where Florin graduated from the High School for Boys No. 3.

Piersic attended the Caragiale Academy of Theatrical Arts and Cinematography in Bucharest. He joined the regular cast of the Romanian National Theater at 1959 and performed in numerous productions until his retirement in 1989. His first role was as Richard in The Devil's Disciple.

In 1958 he made his debut on screen in the French-Romanian co-production The Thistles of the Bărăgan. He appeared in more than forty movies, most of them in the Ceauşescu era. He often depicted heroic, masculine characters. More recently, he played in a soap opera.

Piersic married three times: to Tatiana Iekel (their marriage lasted from 1962 to 1974), with whom he had a son, Florin Jr.; To Anna Széles (1975–1985), the mother of another son, Daniel; and from 1993, he is married to Anna Török.

In 2006, he was voted to the 51st place on the 100 greatest Romanians list. In 2008 he became an honorary citizen of Oradea. In 2009, he was bestowed with the lifetime achievement award in the Transilvania International Film Festival.

Selected filmography
1957 – The Thistles of the Bărăgan - Tănase
1961 – A Bomb Was Stolen - The Young Gangster 
1965 – Harap Alb - Harap Alb
1968 – The Last Roman  
1968 – The Column - Sabinus
1970 – Liberation - Otto Skorzeny
1971 – Michael the Brave - Preda Buzescu
1975 – Stephen the Great - Vaslui 1475 - Cristea Jder
1976 - Pintea Viteazul - Grigore Pintea
1977 - Oil! - Dan
1980 - Drumul oaselor - Mărgelatu
1981 - Trandafirul galben - Mărgelatu
1983 - Misterele Bucureștilor - Mărgelatu
1985 - Masca de argint - Mărgelatu
1986 - Colierul de turcoaze - Mărgelatu
1987 - Totul se plătește - Mărgelatu
2004 - Numai iubirea - Octavian
2005 - Eminescu vs Eminem
2005 - Lacrimi de iubire - Alexandra's father
2006 - Lacrimi de iubire - filmul - Titus Mateescu
2009 - State de România - General Teodorescu
2014 - O nouă viață - Tase
2016 - Străini în noapte
2019 - Sacrificiul - Aristide
2020 - Sacrificiul: Alegerea - Aristide

References

External links

1936 births
Living people
Actors from Cluj-Napoca
Romanian male stage actors
Romanian male film actors
Romanian male television actors
20th-century Romanian male actors
21st-century Romanian male actors
Caragiale National University of Theatre and Film alumni